is a city located in Chiba Prefecture, Japan. , the city had an estimated population of  42,476 in 18,115 households and a population density of 210 persons per km².

Geography
It is on the southwest coast of Bōsō Peninsula, facing the Uraga Channel at the southern end of Tokyo Bay. Cape Futtsu protrudes into Tokyo Bay, and the coastal areas are part of the Minami Bōsō Quasi-National Park.

Neighboring municipalities
Chiba Prefecture
Kimitsu
Kamogawa
Kyonan

Climate
Futtsu has a humid subtropical climate (Köppen Cfa) characterized by warm summers and cool winters with light to no snowfall.  The average annual temperature in Futtsu is 15.7 °C. The average annual rainfall is 1695 mm with September as the wettest month. The temperatures are highest on average in August, at around 26.5 °C, and lowest in January, at around 6.0 °C.

Demographics
Per Japanese census data, the population of Futtsu has declined in recent decades.

History
The area of modern Futtsu has been inhabited since the Japanese Paleolithic period, and numerous remains from the Jōmon, Yayoi and Kofun period have been found within the city limits. The area also is prominent in the Yamatotakeru mythology. Under the Ritsuryō system of the Nara period, the area became part of Amaha County and Sue County of Kazusa Province. Large scale shōen in the Heian period gave way to feudal samurai estates in the Kamakura period, with large portions controlled by the temple of Shomyo-ji in Mutsuura. The area was contested between the Takeda clan and Satomi clan during the Sengoku period. During the Edo period under the Tokugawa shogunate, most of the area was under the control of Sanuki Domain. After the Meiji Restoration, the area came under Kimitsu District

Futtsu village was established with the creation of the modern municipalities system on April 1, 1889. It was elevated to town status on December 1, 1897. Futtsu expanded through merger with neighboring Aoyagi Town on March 31, 1955, and again through merger with Amaha Town and Osawa Town on April 25, 1971. Futtsu attained city status on September 1, 1971.

According to Victory at Sea (H. Saloman and R. Hanser, Doubleday, 1959), Futtsu was on August 30, 1945 the site of the initial Allied landing on the Japanese mainland following the declared surrender. This was a test whether the Japanese would obey the Emperor's surrender order.  There was no resistance.

Government
Futtsu has a mayor-council form of government with a directly elected mayor and a unicameral city council of 16 members. Futtsu contributes one member to the Chiba Prefectural Assembly. In terms of national politics, the city is part of Chiba 12th district of the lower house of the Diet of Japan.

Economy
Futtsu has a mixed economy based on commercial fishing, agriculture, tourism, and electrical power generation.The Futtsu Power Station is one of the largest thermal power plants in the world; it is fed with liquefied natural gas brought it by LNG carrier ocean ships. The southern portion of the city is within the Keiyo Industrial Zone, with metal products, general machinery and equipment manufacturing factories.

Education
Futtsu has eight public elementary schools and three public middle schools operated by the city government, and two public high schools operated by the Chiba Prefectural Board of Education.

Transportation

Railway
 JR East – Uchibō Line
 -  -  -  -  -

Highway
 
 (connecting Tokyo and Chiba)

Sister city relations
 – Carlsbad, California, United States, from October 25, 1988

Local attractions
 Mount Nokogiri
Chiba Prefectural Futtsu Park
Tokyo Bay Kannon
Mother Farm

Notable people from Futtsu
Yasukazu Hamada, politician
Kei Yasuda, musician, actress
Yukana, voice actress
Masaaki Hirano, food historian

References

External links

Official Website 

 
Cities in Chiba Prefecture
Populated coastal places in Japan